Corvallis is a ghost town in Smith County, Kansas, United States.

History
Corvallis was issued a post office in 1875. The post office was moved to Athol in 1888.

References

Former populated places in Smith County, Kansas
Former populated places in Kansas